Cécile Brunschvicg, born Cécile Kahn (19 July 1877 in Enghien-les-Bains – 5 October 1946 in Neuilly-sur-Seine), was a French feminist politician. From the 1920s until her death she was regarded as "the grande dame of the feminist movement" in France.

She was born into a Jewish middle-class, republican family. Her familial environment was not inclined to let women study, especially not when they were over 17. Already a "liberated" woman (for the time), it was her meeting, and subsequent marriage to, Léon Brunschvicg, a feminist philosopher and member of the Ligue des droits de l'homme, that spurred her to feminist activism; she became vice-president of the League of Electors for women's suffrage.

The French Union for Women's Suffrage (UFSF: Union française pour le suffrage des femmes) was founded by a group of feminists who had attended a national congress of French feminists in Paris in 1908, led by Jeanne Schmahl and Jane Misme.
The UFSF provided a less militant and more widely acceptable alternative to the Suffrage des femmes of Hubertine Auclert (1848–1914).
The sole objective was to obtain women's suffrage through legal approaches.
The founding meeting of 300 women was held in February 1909. Cécile Brunschvicg was made secretary-general.
Schmahl was the first president.
Eliska Vincent accepted the position of honorary vice-president.
The UFSF was formally recognized by the International Woman Suffrage Alliance (IWFA) congress in London in April 1909 as representing the French suffrage movement.

Cécile Brunschvicg was named Undersecretary of State for national education in the first Léon Blum government.

Notes

Sources 

 Biography at the University of Angers

1877 births
1946 deaths
Jewish feminists
People from Enghien-les-Bains
20th-century French Jews
Radical Party (France) politicians
French feminists
Secretaries of State of France
French women in World War I
French suffragists
Women government ministers of France
20th-century French politicians
20th-century French women politicians
Jewish suffragists